"Got a Lot o' Livin' to Do!" is a song first recorded by Elvis Presley as part of the soundtrack for his 1957 motion picture Loving You.

History 
The song was written by Aaron Schroeder and Ben Weisman. The latter, a songwriter from New York, came (according to the book Elvis Day by Day, "presumably in hopes of seeing that his song, "Got a Lot O' Livin' to Do," [would] be included in the soundtrack“) to the recording studio in Hollywood where Presley was working on the songs for the movie. Elvis Presley later recalled:

No other songwriter wrote as many songs for Presley as Ben Weisman did.

Reception 
In Europe "Got a Lot o' Livin' to Do!" was released as a single with "Party" on the other side. Both songs appeared on the UK Singles Chart (as published by the Official Charts Company): "Party" charted 15 weeks, peaking at number 2 for the week of October 10, while "Got a Lot o' Livin' to Do!" charted 4 weeks, peaking at number 17 for the week of October 24.

Musical style and lyrics 
The song is a sprightly, speedy number Its lyrics include the line: "There's a moon that's big and bright".

Charts

References 

1957 songs
1957 singles
Elvis Presley songs
RCA Records singles
Songs written by Aaron Schroeder
Songs with music by Ben Weisman